The Ungureanu cabinet was a cabinet of ministers which briefly governed Romania during early 2012. Mihai Răzvan Ungureanu was designated by former President Traian Băsescu to form a new government after the previous PM before, more specifically Emil Boc, left office in the wake of the 2012 Romanian protests, decision officially approved by the state president on 9 February 2012. Ungureanu's cabinet did not last in office long as it was subsequently dissolved on 27 April 2012.

References 

Cabinets of Romania
Coalition governments
2012 establishments in Romania
2012 disestablishments in Romania
Cabinets established in 2012
Cabinets disestablished in 2012